Springdale is a borough in Allegheny County, Pennsylvania, United States,  northeast of Pittsburgh along the Allegheny River. The population was 3,400 at the 2020 census.

Geography
Springdale is located at  (40.541491, -79.782124).

Streams

Riddle Run joins the Allegheny River at Springdale.

Surrounding and adjacent neighborhoods
Springdale has two land borders, including Springdale Township to the north and Cheswick to the west.  Adjacent across the Allegheny River to the east and south is Plum.

Demographics

As of the census of 2000, there were 3,828 people, 1,685 households, and 1,034 families residing in the borough. The population density was 4,104.2 people per square mile (1,589.2/km2). There were 1,802 housing units at an average density of 1,932.0 per square mile (748.1/km2). The racial makeup of the borough was 99.03% White, 0.29% African American, 0.08% Native American, 0.13% Asian, 0.18% from other races, and 0.29% from two or more races. Hispanic or Latino of any race were 0.21% of the population.

There were 1,685 households, out of which 25.8% had children under the age of 18 living with them, 46.2% were married couples living together, 11.9% had a female householder with no husband present, and 38.6% were non-families. 34.4% of all households were made up of individuals, and 16.5% had someone living alone who was 65 years of age or older. The average household size was 2.26 and the average family size was 2.93.

In the borough the population was spread out, with 21.9% under the age of 18, 6.0% from 18 to 24, 29.5% from 25 to 44, 22.2% from 45 to 64, and 20.5% who were 65 years of age or older. The median age was 41 years. For every 100 females, there were 89.0 males. For every 100 females age 18 and over, there were 86.7 males.

The median income for a household in the borough was $35,440, and the median income for a family was $43,476. Males had a median income of $36,711 versus $25,920 for females. The per capita income for the borough was $19,798. About 3.5% of families and 7.8% of the population were below the poverty line, including 10.2% of those under age 18 and 8.8% of those age 65 or over.

Government and politics

Museums and other points of interest

The Springdale Free Public Library serves the borough.

The Rachel Carson Homestead is located in Springdale.

Springdale is also notable for its proximity to a variety of industrial locations, including a local PPG plant (which celebrated its 75th anniversary in June 2022), and the formerly active Cheswick Generating Station, a coal-fired electric power plant known for its two large smokestacks which dominate the skyline for miles.

Education
The borough is within the Allegheny Valley School District, and is served by Springdale High School. The former Colfax Upper Elementary School sits several blocks below the high school.

Notable people
 Rachel Carson, a marine biologist who authored Silent Spring
 Conrad Susa, renowned composer of opera and Juilliard alumnus.

See also
 List of crossings of the Allegheny River (coal mine tunnels)
 Logans Ferry Mine Tunnel

References

External links
 Community profile
 Springdale Borough Website

Populated places established in 1820
1820 establishments in Pennsylvania
Pittsburgh metropolitan area
Boroughs in Allegheny County, Pennsylvania